Tickets for a Prayer Wheel is a book of poetry by Annie Dillard first published in 1974. The poems are based on the author's quest for spiritual knowledge.

References

1974 poetry books
American poetry collections
Books published by university presses